A short corner can be either:

 A penalty corner in field hockey
 A strategy in taking a corner kick in association football
 another term for a short squeeze, a way to corner a market